Cherryvale can refer to a place in the United States:

Cherryvale, Indiana
Cherryvale, Kansas
Cherryvale, South Carolina